Philip Thresher (1 March 1844 — 11 April 1883) was an English first-class cricketer and barrister.

The son of The Reverend Philip Thresher senior, he was born in March 1844 at Hamble-le-Rice. He was educated at Winchester College, before matriculating to University College, Oxford. Thresher made his debut in first-class cricket for Hampshire against Surrey at Southampton in 1865. He played first-class cricket for Hampshire until 1869, making five appearances. He scored 93 runs in his five first-class matches, at an average of 11.62 and with a highest score of 47 not out. Thresher joined the West Kent Cricket Club in the late 1860s, an association which he would maintain until 1875 when he became stricken by ill-health. A student of the Inner Temple, he was called to the bar to practice as a barrister in 1868. Thresher died, unmarried, in April 1883 at Shepherd's Bush.

References

External links

1844 births
1883 deaths
People from Hamble-le-Rice
People educated at Winchester College
Alumni of University College, Oxford
English cricketers
Hampshire cricketers
Members of the Inner Temple
English barristers